Charadrahyla is a genus of frogs in the family Hylidae. It is endemic to tropical southern Mexico. The generic name was derived from Greek charadra ("ravine") and Hyla, in reference to the habits of these frogs. Accordingly, common name ravine treefrogs has been coined for the genus.

Taxonomy and systematics
This genus was erected in 2005 following a major revision of the Hylidae. The genus was originally diagnosed using molecular markers; no morphological synapomorphies supporting the new genus could be identified. The sister taxon of Charadrahyla is Megastomatohyla.

Five of the species in this genus were previously placed in the genus Hyla. Two species were later described as new in this genus, and another two were transferred from Exerodonta in 2018 based on molecular data.

Description
Charadrahyla are relatively large, stream-breeding frogs from cloud forests and humid pine-oak forests of central and southern Mexico. Most species have a brownish dorsum with large blotches (exception is Charadrahyla altipotens).

Species 
As of 2019, there are ten recognized species:
 Charadrahyla altipotens (Duellman, 1968) — yellowbelly voiceless tree frog
 Charadrahyla chaneque (Duellman, 1961) — fairy tree frog 
 Charadrahyla esperancensis Canseco-Márquez, Ramírez-González, and González-Bernal, 2017
 Charadrahyla juanitae (Snyder, 1972)
 Charadrahyla nephila (Mendelson and Campbell, 1999)
 Charadrahyla pinorum (Taylor, 1937)
 Charadrahyla sakbah Jiménez-Arcos, Calzada-Arciniega, Alfaro-Juantorena, Vázquez-Reyes, Blair & Parra-Olea, 2019
 Charadrahyla taeniopus (Günther, 1901) — porthole tree frog
 Charadrahyla tecuani Campbell, Blancas-Hernández, and Smith, 2009
 Charadrahyla trux (Adler and Dennis, 1972) — spine-fingered tree frog

References

 
Hylinae
Amphibian genera
Endemic amphibians of Mexico
Taxa named by Jonathan A. Campbell
Taxa named by Darrel Frost